The San Diego State University College of Arts & Letters provides liberal arts education at SDSU. Its programs in the humanities and social sciences are offered through nineteen academic departments and a number of interdisciplinary programs, each of which is designed to help students understand their role in society and to develop aesthetic sensibilities. With 300 permanent faculty and many associated lecturers, this is the largest of the seven colleges, and is responsible for over one-third of the instruction at SDSU. Because the college occupies an important role in general education, virtually all SDSU students take courses offered here.

Academics

Degrees
 BA
 MA
 Ed.D
 Ph.D

Degree programs
The College of Arts & Letters includes several degree programs housed in 19 academic departments:

 Africana Studies
 American Indian Studies
 Anthropology
 Asian and Pacific Studies
 Chicana and Chicano Studies
 Classics
 Comparative International Studies
 Comparative Literature
 Economics
 English
 European Studies
 French
 Geography
 German
 History
 Humanities
 International Business
 International Security and Conflict Resolution
 Italian
 Japanese
 Modern Jewish Studies
 Latin American Studies
 Lesbian, Gay, Bisexual,Transsexual,Queer+ Studies
 Liberal Arts and Sciences
 Linguistics
 Philosophy
 Political Science
 Study of Religion
 Rhetoric & Writing Studies
 Russian
 Social Science
 Sociology
 Spanish & Portuguese
 Sustainability
 Urban Studies
 Women's Studies - The first Women's Studies Program in the United States.

Special programs
Institute for International Security and Conflict Resolution (ISCOR)

Institutes and research centers
 Behner Stiefel Center for Brazilian Studies
 Center for International Business Education & Research (CIBER)
 Center for Information Convergence and Strategy (CICS)
National Center for the Study of Children’s Literature
 Center for War and Society
 Institute for Regional Studies of the Californias (ISRC)
 International Institute for Ethics
 Japan Research Institute (Japan Studies Institute)
 Lipinsky Institute for Judaic Studies
 Chinese Studies Institute

Special facilities
Social Science Research Laboratory (SSRL)
The Stephen and Mary Birch Foundation Center for Earth Systems Analysis Research (CESAR)

Publications
San Diego State University Press – the oldest university press in the California State University system, with noted specializations in Border Studies, Critical Theory, Latin American Studies, and Cultural Studies.
Pacific Review – magazine published by undergraduate and graduate students in the Department of English and Comparative Literature at San Diego State University.
 Academic journal
 SDSU Occasional Archaeological Paper series
 Poetry International – literary magazine published annually by San Diego State University Press that was established in 1997. The journal has since its 4th issue included a section focusing on poetry in translation from one nation.

References

External links

A
Liberal arts colleges at universities in the United States